TR90 may refer to:

 Trabzon Subregion (TR90), a statistical subregion of Turkey
 EMI TR90, a British Tape Recorder
 TR90 resin, a material used by Sunnies Studios
 TR90 Programs, a Programs[TR90https://id.wikipedia.org/wiki/Tr90]